Frederick X. "Rick" Gibbons is an American psychologist who has been a professor of psychology at the University of Connecticut since August 2012. His research focuses on social psychology and health psychology.

Biography
Gibbons received his Ph.D. from the University of Texas at Austin in 1976. His Ph.D. thesis was entitled Self-focused attention and the enhancement of response awareness, and was supervised by Robert Wicklund. Before joining the faculty of the University of Connecticut, he taught at Iowa State University, where he became a distinguished professor before leaving to become a professor at Dartmouth College in 2008.

References

External links
Faculty page

Page at Social Psychology Network

University of Connecticut faculty
Living people
American social psychologists
University of Texas at Austin faculty
Iowa State University faculty
Dartmouth College faculty
Year of birth missing (living people)